Inverleith is one of the seventeen wards used to elect members of the City of Edinburgh Council. Established in 2007 along with the other wards, it currently elects four Councillors.

It covers an area to the north-west of the city centre, with the northern boundary mostly on Ferry Road and much of the southern boundary formed by the Water of Leith (the main exception being the Stockbridge neighbourhood on its right bank), including Blackhall, Comely Bank, Craigleith, Dean Village, Drylaw, Inverleith, Orchard Brae and Warriston, as well as part of Canonmills which is split with the Leith Walk ward. Although its residential parts are mostly fairly compact and densely populated, the ward also includes several open areas, including the Royal Botanic Gardens Edinburgh, three cemeteries, a golf course and playing fields for numerous schools. A minor 2017 boundary change saw the loss of a residential area (between Roseburn Footpath and Stewart's Melville College) with a negligible effect on the population, which in 2019 was recorded at 34,236.

Councillors

Election Results

2022 Election
2022 City of Edinburgh Council election

2017 Election
2017 City of Edinburgh Council election

On 23 April 2018, SNP councillor Gavin Barrie resigned from the party and became an Independent, after losing his position in the ruling administration as Economy Convener, following a vote at the SNP group AGM.

2012 Election
2012 City of Edinburgh Council election

2007 Election
2007 City of Edinburgh Council election

References

External links
Listed Buildings in Inverleith Ward, City of Edinburgh at British Listed Buildings

Wards of Edinburgh